The Oakland Athletics are a Major League Baseball (MLB) franchise based in Oakland, California. The Athletics formed in 1901 as the Philadelphia Athletics; after moving to Kansas City for 13 seasons, the Athletics relocated to Oakland in 1968. Through 2014, the Athletics have played 17,757 games, winning 8,622, losing 9,048, and tying 87, for a winning percentage of approximately .488. This list documents the superlative records and accomplishments of team members during their tenures as Athletics.

Eddie Plank holds the most franchise records as of the end of the 2014 season, with ten, including the most career wins, losses and hit batsmen. He is followed by Jimmie Foxx, who holds nine records, including the best career on-base percentage and the single-season home runs record, as well as Al Simmons, who holds the single season hit and RBI records.

Four Athletics hold Major League records. Offensively, Rickey Henderson holds the single-season modern day steals record, recording 130 over 149 games played during the 1982 season. Frankie Hayes is tied for the single-game doubles record, recording four in a game on July 25, 1936. Eddie Collins stole six bases twice in September 1912; his mark would later be tied by Otis Nixon, Eric Young and Carl Crawford. Defensively, Bruno Haas, who spent his only professional season with the Athletics, holds the single game walks allowed record, pitching 16 in his Major League debut.

Table key

Statistics current through the 2014 season

Individual career records
Batting statistics; pitching statistics

Individual single-season recordsBatting statistics; pitching statistics

Team season records
Source:

* Also an American League record.

Individual single game records
Source:

Team all-time records
Source:

See also

Baseball statistics
Oakland Athletics award winners and league leaders

Notes
 Henderson holds the record under modern rules; Hugh Nicol recorded 138 stolen bases in 1887. However, prior to 1898, a stolen base was credited to a baserunner who reached an extra base on a hit from another player.
 Tied with 48 others
 Tied with 20 others
 Tied with Otis Nixon, Eric Young and Carl Crawford for the modern-day record.
 Tied with Bill George, George Van Haltren and Tommy Byrne
 Tied with Tommy Thomas, Tim Wakefield, R. A. Dickey and James Shields
 Tied with Joe Harris

References

External links

Records
Oakland Athletics